New Hinksey is a suburb in the south of the city of Oxford.

Geography
The suburb is west of the Abingdon Road (A4144). To the north is Grandpont and to the east, over Donnington Bridge, which crosses the River Thames, is Cowley.

Amenities
The original Church of England parish church of Saint John the Evangelist was designed by the Gothic Revival architect EG Bruton and built in 1870. In 1900 it was demolished and replaced by one designed by the Scots architects William Bucknall and Ninian Comper. New Hinksey Church of England Primary School is on Vicarage Road, beside St. John the Evangelist church. There is a large outdoor public swimming pool in Hinksey Park between New Hinksey and Grandpont.

History
The suburb of New Hinksey was developed in the 19th century.  Until then the area was covered by water meadows.  New Hinksey was in Berkshire, in the parish of South Hinksey, until 1889, when it was absorbed into the city of Oxford. It remained in the ecclesiastical parish of South Hinksey, which is now called the parish of South with New Hinksey.

References

Sources

Areas of Oxford